Fier is the seventh most populous city of the Republic of Albania and seat of Fier County and Fier Municipality. It is situated on the bank of Gjanica River in the Myzeqe Plain between the Seman in the north, the Vjosë in the south and the foothills of the Mallakastra Mountains in the southeast. Fier experiences a seasonal Mediterranean climate effected by its proximity to the Adriatic Sea in the west.

Fier was founded in the 19th century by the Vrioni family and officially in 1864 by Omer Pasha Vrioni II who was the father of Kahreman Pasha Vrioni (1889-1955).

Fier is an important terminus in southwestern Albania and is served by the A2 motorway and SH 4 highway, forming a north–south corridor in Albania and part of the Adriatic–Ionian motorway.

Name 

The word "Fier" is claimed to derive from the Albanian word fier, which is claimed to mean "fern". Another alternative hypothesis proposes a derivation from the Italian word fiera, translated as trade fair.

History 

The history of Fier is bound up with that of the oil, gas and bitumen deposits nearby. The presence of asphalt and burning escapes of natural gas in the vicinity was recorded as early as the 1st century AD. Dioscorides, in Materia Medica, describes lumps of bitumen in the adjacent river Seman, and the concentrated pitch on the banks of the Vjosë river Strabo, writing in about AD 17 states:

On the territory of the people of Apolonia in Illyria there is what is called a nymphaeum. It is a rock which emits fire. Below it are springs flowing with hot water and asphalt... the asphalt is dug out of a neighbouring hill: the parts excavated are replaced by fresh earth, which in time is converted to asphalt.

In the 14th and 15th century the location was used by the Venetian traders as a marketplace to purchase agricultural products from the Myzeqe lowlands.

The settlement took city status in 1864 when Kahreman Pasha Vrioni, the local governor, asked from some French architects to project a future city as an artisan and trade centre. During the 1864–1865 period a market for 122 merchants was built along the Gjanica river. The first inhabitants of the city were the servants of Kahreman Pasha Vrioni and members of Aromanian families that had lived in the area since the early 19th century period.

Twelve kilometres away from Fier is situated Apollonia, one of the two most important ancient Illyrian colonial settlements in present-day Albania. It was founded in 600 BC on a hill near the sea, and near what was then the course of Vjosë river by Ancient Greek settlers from Corfu and Corinth. At the time before the changes in land formation and the Adriatic coastline caused by an earthquake in the 3rd century AD, the harbour af Apollonia could accommodate as many as 100 ships. The site is thought to be on the southern boundary of a native Illyrian settlement, being mentioned in Periplus, a sailor's account of the Adriatic written in the middle of the 4th century BC by a Greek writer. It was near the territory occupied by the Illyrian tribes and close to the Greek tribe of the Chaonians. The colony was said to have been named Gylaceia after its Corinthian founder, Gylax, and later changed its name to that of city of the God Apollo. According to archaeological investigations for 100 years Greek and Illyrian have lived in separate communities.

The economic prosperity of Apolonia grew on the basis of trade in slaves, and the local rich pastoral agricultural. In the middle of the 5th century BC, a workshop for minting coins was set up here. Through trade and commercial transactions these coins spread throughout Illyria and beyond its boundaries. In the years 214 BC onwards, the city was involved in the war between the Illyrian Taulantii and Cassander, the king of Macedonia, and in 229 BC came under Roman control. In 168 BC, its loyalty to Rome was rewarded. For 200 years, it was of central importance in the Roman effort to colonize the east and may have been an original terminus of the Egnatian Way. It was a vital stronghold for Caesar in the civil war between Pompey and Julius Caesar. In 45 and 44 BC, Octavian, later to become the Emperor Augustus, studied for 6 months in Apolonia, which had established a high reputation as a center of Greek learning, especially the art of rhetoric. It was noted by Cicero, in the Philippics, as 'magna urbs et gravis' a great and important city.

Under the Empire, Apolonia remained a prosperous centre, but began to decline as the Vjosë silted up and the coastline changed after the earthquake.

Since the fall of communism the city of Fier has undergone many changes. For one, an important church was constructed that allows people to practice their religion. Construction has also been taking place in the city and today Fier is home to one of the largest malls in the country.

Geography 

Fier is located on the bank of Gjanica in the southeast of the Myzeqe Plain between the Seman in the north and Vjosë in the south of Fier near the Adriatic Sea in southwestern Albania. The municipality of Fier is encompassed in the County of Fier within the Southern Region of Albania and consists of the adjacent administrative units of Cakran, Dërmenas, Frakull, Levan, Libofshë, Mbrostar, Portëz, Qendër, Topojë and Fier as its seat. It stretches from the mouth of Seman within the Divjakë-Karavasta National Park in the northwest across the Albanian Adriatic Sea Coast until it reaches the mouth of Vjosë in the Vjosa-Narta Protected Landscape in the southwest, also forming the southern border of the municipality. The area of the municipality Fier is 619.9 km2.

Climate 

Fier has a Mediterranean climate (Csa) under the Köppen climate classification with mild winters and hot, dry summers.

Economy 

Fier is an important industrial city and is built by the Gjanica tributary of the Seman River, and is surrounded by marshland. With nearby Patos town, it is the centre of the oil, bitumen and chemical industries in Albania. Fier is a convenient place to stay to visit the major Classical sites at nearby Byllis and Apollonia. Main roads from the central square lead south to Vlora and east to the oil and industrial town of Patos.
Also,  to the west of the city centre, one will find the picturesque Seman Beach.

Fier is also known for its olive trees production (Kalinjioti cultivar) which contributes to the olive oil sector of Albania. Together with Vlora, Berat and Elbasan they provide almost 90% of olive oil production.

The city also plays an important economic role in the development of the county since it produces many goods such as sugar, bread and animal products.

The creation of the Trans Adriatic Pipeline raises the economy of Fier and Albania highly. The pipe line will be crossing Fier and a Pumping Station will be built in Fier. This shows an open road to investment and employment 
of the city and country. The Pipe line has started since 2015 and is expected to be completed in 2020. This will Supply Albania Natural Gas.

Transport 

There are Urban Buses available throughout the city. There are also buses at the bus terminal in Fier that can take you throughout places in Albania and Balkan region. Fier is served by Fier railway station. There used to be trains during the communism era and till this day there has been no movement of the trains. The SH4 is a state road that takes you from Durres to Fier. The SH8 is also a state road that will take you from Fier to Vlore. There is a project for the Fier and Vlore highway.

Demography 

Fier is the seventh most populous city and sixth most populous municipality in Albania. As of the 2011 census, the municipal unit of Fier had an estimated population of 55,845 of whom 27,767 were men and 28,078 women. The municipality of Fier, including its adjacent administrative units, had a total population of 120,655 in 2011. Fier, as other cities of southern Albania, has a religious mixed population, consisting of Muslims and Orthodox Christians. Data shows that in 1918, after Albanian independence from the Ottoman Empire, Fier and its surrounding countryside on the Myzeqe Plain formed a majority Orthodox Christian enclave, in which Muslims constituted roughly 35% of the total population.

Culture 

Fier's main sports are football and basketball. The main soccer team of Fier is KF Apolonia and plays in the Albanian First Division. There is another team called KF Çlirimi which plays in the Albanian Second Division. KF Apolonia home ground is Loni Papuçiu Stadium. KF Clirimi plays on Stadiumi Fusha Sportive e Shkolles Bujqesore. The basketball club of Fier is BC Apolonia and plays in the Albanian Basketball League and their home ground is Fier Sports Palace.

Notable people 

Notable people born in Fier include:

Besa Kokëdhima
Eleni Foureira
Ermal Meta
Hasna Xhukiçi
Helena Kadare
Jani Minga
Jakov Xoxa
Keidi Bare
Liri Gero
Odise Roshi
Qemal Bey Vrioni
Rovena Stefa

International relations 

Fier is twinned with:
 Cleveland, Ohio,  United States

Fier also cooperates with:
 Lanzhou, Gansu,  China
 Peja, Peja District, Kosovo

Notes

References

External links 

bashkiafier.gov.al – Official Website 

 
Cities in Albania
Administrative units of Fier
Municipalities in Fier County
Aromanian settlements in Albania